Elections to Liverpool Town Council were held on Monday 2 November 1856. One third of the council seats were up for election, the term of office of each councillor being three years.

Eleven of the sixteen wards were uncontested.

After the election, the composition of the council was:

Election result

Because of the large number of uncontested seats, these statistics should be taken in that context.

Ward results

* - Retiring Councillor seeking re-election

Abercromby

Castle Street

Everton

Exchange

Great George

Lime Street

North Toxteth

Pitt Street

Rodney Street

{{Election box candidate with party link|
  |party      = Conservative Party (UK)
  |candidate  = James Aspinall Tobin *
  |votes      = ''236  |percentage = 81%  |change     = 
}}

St. Anne Street

St. Paul's

St. Peter's

Scotland

South Toxteth

Vauxhall

West Derby

Aldermanic Elections

On 10 November 1856, the term of office of eight aldermen who were elected on 9 November 1850 expired.

The following were elected as Aldermen by the Council on 10 November 1856 for a term of office of six years.*''' - re-elected Alderman.

See also
Liverpool Town Council elections 1835 - 1879
Liverpool City Council elections 1880–present
Mayors and Lord Mayors of Liverpool 1207 to present
History of local government in England

References

1856
1856 English local elections
November 1856 events
1850s in Liverpool